Pierre Gimonnet & Fils is a Grower Champagne producer and an original member of the Club Trésors de Champagne.
The domaine has  28 hectares based in the Côte des Blancs with Premier cru sites in Cuis and Mareuil-sur Aÿ, and Grand crus in Cramant, Chouilly, Oger, Vertus, and Aÿ; the fields are planted to 98% chardonnay and  2% pinot noir. The house produces 20,000 cases annually. The house is noted for old vines, with 70%   over 30 years old, and even century-old vines in the Grand Cru  lieux-dits of Le Fond du Bateau (planted in 1911) and Buisson (planted in 1913).  Three generations of the family have produced Champagne; today, the estate is managed by Didier and Olivier Gimonnet.

References

External links

Champagne (wine)
Club Trésors de Champagne